The Strong Way is a 1917 American silent drama film directed by George Kelson and starring June Elvidge, John Bowers and Isabel Berwin.

Cast
 June Elvidge as Eunice Torrence 
 John Bowers as Don Chadwick 
 Isabel Berwin as Mrs. Torrence 
 Joseph Herbert as Geoffrey Farrow 
 Rosina Henley as Martha 
 Grace Williams as Stenographer 
 Hubert Wilke as Dan Carter

References

Bibliography
 John T. Soister, Henry Nicolella, Steve Joyce. American Silent Horror, Science Fiction and Fantasy Feature Films, 1913-1929. McFarland, 2014.

External links
 

1917 films
1917 drama films
1910s English-language films
American silent feature films
Silent American drama films
Films directed by George Kelson
American black-and-white films
World Film Company films
1910s American films